Uaru amphiacanthoides, the uaru or triangle cichlid, is a species of cichlid native to South America where it occurs in clear streams of the Amazon Basin.  This species can reach a length of  SL.  It is also of importance as a food fish for native peoples and can be found in the aquarium trade.

See also
 List of freshwater aquarium fish species

References
 Heckel JJ (1840) Johann Natterer's neue Flussfische Brasilien's nach den Beobachtungen und Mittheilungen des Entdeckers beschrieben (Erste Abtheilung, Die Labroiden). Annalen des Wierner Museums der Natrugeschichte v. 2: 325-471, Pls. 29-30.

External links
 Photograph

amphiacanthoides
Fish described in 1840
Taxa named by Johann Jakob Heckel